Mystacidium, abbreviated as Mycdm in horticultural trade, is a genus of the orchid family (Orchidaceae). It is native to eastern and southern Africa from Tanzania to South Africa.

Species accepted as of June 2014:

 Mystacidium aliciae Bolus - South Africa
 Mystacidium braybonae Summerh.  - South Africa
 Mystacidium capense (L.f.) Schltr. - South Africa, Swaziland
 Mystacidium flanaganii (Bolus) Bolus  - South Africa
 Mystacidium gracile Harv.  - South Africa, Zimbabwe
 Mystacidium nguruense P.J.Cribb - Tanzania
 Mystacidium pulchellum (Kraenzl.) Schltr.  - Tanzania
 Mystacidium pusillum Harv. - South Africa
 Mystacidium tanganyikense Summerh.  - Tanzania, Zimbabwe, Zambia, Malawi
 Mystacidium venosum  Harv. ex Rolfe in W.H.Harvey - South Africa, Swaziland, Mozambique

References

Vandeae genera
Angraecinae
Orchids of Africa